Daijirō, Daijiro or Daijirou (written: 大二郎, 大二朗, 大次郎 or 大治郎) is a masculine Japanese given name. Notable people with the name include:

, Japanese politician
, Japanese motorcycle racer
, Japanese mixed martial artist and professional wrestler
, Japanese manga artist
, Japanese rugby union player
, Japanese baseball player
, Japanese footballer
, Japanese footballer
, Japanese baseball player
, Japanese drifting driver

Japanese masculine given names